Germplasm are living genetic resources such as seeds or tissues that are maintained for the purpose of animal and plant breeding, preservation, and other research uses. These resources may take the form of seed collections stored in seed banks, trees growing in nurseries, animal breeding lines maintained in animal breeding programs or gene banks, etc.  Germplasm collections can range from collections of wild species to elite, domesticated breeding lines that have undergone extensive human selection. Germplasm collection is important for the maintenance of biological diversity and food security.

In the United States, germplasm resources are regulated by the National Genetic Resources Program (NGRP), created by the U.S. congress in 1990. In addition the web server The Germplasm Resources Information Network (GRIN) provides information about germplasms as they pertain to agriculture production.

See also:
Animal genetic resources for food and agriculture
Conservation biology
Cryoconservation of animal genetic resources
Forest genetic resources
International Treaty on Plant Genetic Resources for Food and Agriculture
Plant genetic resources
Seed saving

References
Day-Rubenstein, K and Heisey, P. 2003. Plant Genetic Resources: New Rules for International Exchange
  63 p. 
Economic Research Service. Global resources and productivity: questions and answers
  174 p. 
SeedQuest Primer Germplasm Resources

References

External links
USDA-ARS Germplasm Resources Information Network (GRIN)
Bioversity International
Bioversity International: Germplasm Collection
Bioversity International: Germplasm Databases
Bioversity International: Germplasm Documentation - overview
Bioversity International: Germplasm Health
 DAD-IS: Domestic Animal Diversity Information System

Developmental biology
Conservation biology
Food security
Biorepositories